Probuzhdeniye is a rural locality (a settlement) and the administrative center of Perevalenskoye Rural Settlement, Podgorensky District, Voronezh Oblast, Russia. The population was 487 as of 2010. There are 8 streets.

Geography 
Probuzhdeniye is located 21 km north of Podgorensky (the district's administrative centre) by road. Perevalnoye is the nearest rural locality.

References 

Rural localities in Podgorensky District